The United Evangelical Church in Puerto Rico is a Reformed and congregational denomination in Puerto Rico. The church was founded on January 28, 1931, in Fajardo as a result of the union of the congregational Church, the Evangelical United Brethren Church and the Christian Church.In January 1990 it became a conference of the United Church of Christ. But in 2006 the Puerto Rican Conference dissolved all relations with the UCC because of LGBT issues. In 2006 it had 61 congregations and 42 house fellowships.

References

External links
Official website 

Reformed denominations in Central America
Christianity in Puerto Rico
Christian organizations established in 1931
Evangelical denominations in North America